The Detroit Lions are a professional American football team based in Detroit, Michigan. The Lions compete in the National Football League (NFL) as a member club of the league's National Football Conference (NFC) North division. The team plays its home games at Ford Field in Downtown Detroit. Originally based in Portsmouth, Ohio and called the Portsmouth Spartans, the team began play in 1928 as an independent professional team.

The Lions have won four NFL championships, tied for 9th overall in total championships amongst all 32 NFL franchises; although the last was in 1957, which gives the club the second-longest NFL championship drought behind the Arizona Cardinals. The Lions were the first franchise to finish a full (non-strike shortened) regular season with no wins or ties since the move to sixteen season games in 1978, going 0–16 during the 2008 NFL season. They are also one of four current teams, and the only one in the NFC, to have never played in the Super Bowl. Two of these teams, the Jacksonville Jaguars and the Houston Texans, are expansion teams that began play in 1995 and 2002 respectively. Further, the Cleveland Browns were on hiatus in the 1996-1998 seasons, meaning that the Lions are the only team that has never played in the Super Bowl despite fielding a team in every NFL season since the first Super Bowl in 1967. Additionally, the Lions have won only a single post-season game since 1957, and have the NFL's longest active drought between playoff wins, with the Lions last post-season victory coming in 1991. Since then, the Lions have lost nine consecutive playoff games.

Seasons

See also
 History of the Detroit Lions

Notes

References
 
 

 
Detroit Lions
seasons
Seasons